Earl H. Elfers (May 26, 1913 – September 1, 1983) was a member of the Wisconsin State Assembly.

Biography
Elfers was born on May 26, 1913 in Bassett, Wisconsin. He attended high school in Wilmot, Wisconsin. He died on September 1, 1983.

Career
Elfers was a Democrat. He was elected to the Assembly in 1962. The election was contested due to ballots that were initially declared invalid. The Republican-dominated lower house voted to install Russell Olson, a Republican, instead, after Elfers had already been seated. However, in 1964 the Racine Circuit Court ruled that Elfers was the legitimate assemblyman.

Additionally, Elfers was Chairman of Trevor, Wisconsin, Director of the Trevor School Board, and a member of the Kenosha County, Wisconsin Board.

References

People from Randall, Wisconsin
County supervisors in Wisconsin
Democratic Party members of the Wisconsin State Assembly
School board members in Wisconsin
1913 births
1983 deaths
20th-century American politicians
People from Salem Lakes, Wisconsin